In 2010, the first edition of the SAFF Women's Championship was held from 12 to 23 December 2010 in Bangladesh. It was organised by the South Asian Football Federation.

India won the title without conceding a goal.

Though held in the same year in Bangladesh, and also India winning over Nepal, the tournament is not to be confused with the women's football event for the 2010 South Asian Games.

Fixtures and results

Group A

Group B

Knockout stage

Semi finals

Final

References

External links

2010 in Asian football
2010 in women's association football
2010
2010
2010 in Bangladeshi football
2010–11 in Indian football
2010–11 in Pakistani football
2010 in Maldivian football
2010 in Bhutanese football
2010–11 in Sri Lankan football
2010 in Nepalese sport
2010 in Afghan football